The list of ship launches in 1952 includes a chronological list of all ships launched in 1952.


References 

Sources

1952
Ship launches